Rekowa is a river of Poland. It is a tributary of Rega river near Płoty.

Rivers of Poland
Rivers of West Pomeranian Voivodeship